Georgiyevka is a rural locality (a selo) in Rostashevskoye Rural Settlement, Paninsky District, Voronezh Oblast, Russia. The population was 117 as of 2010.

Geography 
Georgiyevka is located 8 km northwest of Panino (the district's administrative centre) by road. Bereznyagi is the nearest rural locality.

References 

Rural localities in Paninsky District